Barøy Lighthouse is a coastal lighthouse in Narvik Municipality in Nordland county, Norway. The lighthouse is located on the northwestern shore of the island of Barøya. It marks the entrance to the Ofotfjorden, which leads to the inland port of the town of Narvik.

History
The first lighthouse here was built in 1903 and it began its work on 1 October 1903. The light was mounted on a concrete base and attached to the west end of a 1-story wooden lighthouse keeper's house.

The occulting light on top flashes red, white, or green depending on the direction from which it is viewed. The light tower is white with a red top.

See also

Lighthouses in Norway
List of lighthouses in Norway

References

External links
 Norsk Fyrhistorisk Forening 

Lighthouses completed in 1903
Lighthouses in Nordland
Ballangen